Big Mess may refer to:

 Big Mess (Danny Elfman album), 2021
 Big Mess (Grouplove album), 2016
 "Big Mess", song by Devo from the 1982 album Oh, No! It's Devo